Zagłębie Sosnowiec is a football club based in Sosnowiec, Poland. The club was established in 1906. It won Polish Cup four times (1962, 1963, 1977, 1978), and also was four times Polish runner up (1955, 1964, 1967, 1972). Apart from football, the organization of Zagłębie has other departments, such as ice-hockey (KH Zagłębie Sosnowiec; five times Polish champion: 1980, 1981, 1982, 1983, 1985) and men's basketball (twice Polish champion: 1985, 1986).

History
The history of Zagłębie Sosnowiec dates back to 1906, when the city of Sosnowiec belonged to Congress Poland, Russian Empire. In that year, a group of young workers of the Milowice Steelworks formed a sports organization. Their activities were mostly concentrated on playing football at suburban meadows. In 1908, local activist Aleksander Rene was arrested by the Okhrana, and accused of forming an illegal Polish sports organization. Imprisoned in Łódź, he sent a letter to a Russian Governor, who resided in Piotrków Trybunalski, asking for permission to form a Sosnowiec branch of the Union Sports Club from Sankt Petersburg. He was denied, so he wrote again, to the Union headquarters. With the permission of the Sankt Petersburg club, Rene, after leaving prison, formed the team of Union Sosnowiec, which in the first half of the 1910s played several friendly games against local teams.

During World War I, sports activities were cancelled in Sosnowiec. In 1918, Sports Association Victoria was formed. Among its players was famous singer Jan Kiepura. In 1919, Sports Association Sosnowiec was formed by Aleksander Reine. After 12 years, in 1931, both clubs merged to create the team called Unia Sosnowiec. The new team was among the best sides in the region of Zagłębie Dąbrowskie, which in the 1930s had its own regional league, the Zagłębie A-Class.

In 1933, Unia Sosnowiec won the league, qualifying to the Ekstraklasa playoffs, where it lost to Naprzód Lipiny. In 1934, Unia again turned out to be the regional winner, and again it lost the playoffs, this time to Śląsk Świętochłowice. Third attempt at the Ekstraklasa promotion came in 1939. Again Unia, the regional champion, lost the playoffs to both Śląsk Świętochłowice and Fablok Chrzanów. Among the players of Unia's youth teams was Wieslaw Ociepka, who later became chairman of the Polish Football Association (PZPN).

During World War II, Unia played unofficial, conspirational games against local rivals. In 1945, officials and players of Unia formed a team called RKS Sosnowiec, which was soon renamed into RKU Sosnowiec. Its chairman was Major Marian Rodza, military commandant of the city. First postwar manager was Józef Słonecki, who in the 1920s was a player of Pogoń Lwów. In 1946, RKU qualified to the Ekstraklasa playoffs. In the 1/8 finals, it beat Gedania Gdańsk 6–2, to lose 0–4 to AKS Chorzów in the quarterfinals. During the game, which took place in Chorzów, clashes erupted between supporters of both teams, and the game was cancelled. In 1947, RKU was in Group Two of the Ekstraklasa qualifiers. This group was won by AKS Chorzów, RKU was the fourth team, behind AKS, Cracovia and Rymer Radlin.

In 1949, after changing its name into Stal Sosnowiec, the team qualified to the Second Division, remaining there until 1954, when it was finally promoted to the Ekstraklasa. In the 1955 Ekstraklasa, Stal Sosnowiec was a sensation, as it was the runner up, finishing the season in the second spot, only behind CWKS Warsaw. Stal had 27 points, while CWKS had only one point more. In 1956, Stal was the 10th team (out of 12), in 1957, 7th, and was relegated in 1958, to return to the Ekstraklasa in 1960. Stal remained in the top league until 1974, finishing as the runners-up thrice (1964, 1967, 1972).

Meanwhile, in 1962, Stal changed name into GKS Zagłębie . In the mid-1960s, the team from Sosnowiec was among the best Polish sides, as it once won Polish silver, three times bronze, and two times the Polish Cup: in 1962, after beating 2-1 Górnik Zabrze, and in 1963, after beating 2–0 Ruch Chorzów. In 1964, Józef Gałeczka was Ekstraklasa's top scorer. Among other notable players of that time was Andrzej Jarosik, twice Polish top scorer (1970, 1971). Furthermore, Włodzimierz Mazur was the top scorer in 1977.

In 1977 and 1978, Zagłębie twice won the Polish Cup, and in 1979, Wojciech Rudy was named Best Polish Player of the Year.

In 1986, Zagłębie, after 11 years, was relegated to the Second Division. It remained there until June 1989, when Zagłębie returned to the Ekstraklasa. Among its top players were Marek Bęben, Ryszard Czerwiec and Maciej Mizia. After promotion, the games of Zagłębie were attended by thousands of people, with the record, 28,000, watching the match against Górnik Zabrze.

After the 1991 season, Zagłębie avoided relegation in the playoffs, in which it beat Jagiellonia Białystok 0–2, 2–0, and 4–2 in the penalty shootout. In 1992, Zagłębie was relegated, even though among its players was Marek Koniarek. Due to financial problems, the team was soon relegated to the third level. The club was then dissolved.

In 1995, Zagłębie returned in the 5th division, and soon qualified to the fourth, and then third division. In 2000, Zagłębie won promotion to the second level. In 2001, with a new Italian sponsor ERGOM, Zagłębie planned to win promotion back to the top league. Instead, the team was relegated.

In 2004, Zagłębie won promotion to the Second Division. Finally, after the 2006–07 season, Zagłębie returned to the Ekstraklasa. Among its top players were Jacek Berensztajn, Jakub Wierzchowski and Adrian Mierzejewski. The 2007–08 Ekstraklasa season was a failure, as Zagłębie gathered only 16 points, and was relegated again. Among its players at that time was Patryk Małecki.

Stadium
Zagłębie Sosnowiec play their home matches at the ArcelorMittal Park, with a 11,600 capacity.

Current squad

Out on loan

Honours
Polish championship runner-up: 4
 1955, 1964, 1967, 1972
Polish Championship bronze medal: 3
 1962, 1963, 1965
Polish Cup winner: 4
 1962, 1963, 1977, 1978
Polish Cup finalist:
 1971
Semifinal of the 1966/67 UEFA Intertoto Cup
Polish U-19 Runner Up: 1963, Polish U-19 Bronze Medal: 1965

See also
 Football in Poland

References

 Timeline of Zagłębie's history, in Polish

External links

Unofficial website
Zagłębie Sosnowiec at 90minut.pl 
biznes.zaglebie.eu
Official facebook
Twitter
Instagram

 
Association football clubs established in 1945
1945 establishments in Poland
Mining association football clubs in Poland